Juan Bautista Villalba Maldonado (29 August 1924 in Luque – 18 April 2003) was a Paraguayan footballer who played as a striker.

Villalba was a striker, known for his great scoring ability and speed. He played for the Paraguay national football team between 1945 and 1947, scoring ten goals. Villalba had to retire early from football at the age of 30 due to injuries.

References

1924 births
2003 deaths
Paraguayan footballers
Sportivo Luqueño players
Club Atlético Huracán footballers
Expatriate footballers in Argentina
Club Olimpia footballers
Paraguay international footballers
Paraguayan expatriate footballers
Sportspeople from Luque
Expatriate footballers in Colombia
Association football forwards